Kręcko  is a village in the administrative district of Gmina Zbąszynek, within Świebodzin County, Lubusz Voivodeship, in western Poland.

Notable residents 
Paul Rostock (1892 - 1956), war criminal

References

Villages in Świebodzin County